Francavilla Fontana is a town and comune (municipality) in the province of Brindisi and region of Apulia, in southern Italy. It is also called the town of the "Imperiali", after the Imperiali, a family of feudal lords who ruled the town from the end of 16th century until the 18th century. With a population of 36,358, in 2017, it is the third municipality of its province after Brindisi and Fasano. Its one of the many towns in south Italy where the Greek dialect Griko is spoken.

History
The name Francavilla has French-Norman origins: "Franca" (tax-free) and "villa" (town). The specification Fontana ("fountain") alludes to a vision of the Virgin Mary witnessed by Prince Filippo d'Angiò, who hence declaring the town a tax-free haven, according to the local legend.

Geography
The municipality borders with Ceglie Messapica, Grottaglie, Latiano, Manduria, Oria, San Marzano di San Giuseppe, San Michele Salentino, San Vito dei Normanni, Sava  and Villa Castelli.

Main sights
 The massive square Castle (Palazzo Imperiali) of the Imperiali family, to whom, with Oria, it was sold by St. Charles Borromeo in the 16th century for 40,000 ounces of gold, which he distributed in one day to poor and plague-infected people in Milan.
 Mother Church, built from 1743 over a former Angevine construction.
Torre dell'Orologio (watchtower), built in 1750.

Transport

The town, 18 km east of Taranto-Grottaglie Airport, is served by the SS7 "Appia" highway. The local railway station is a junction point between the lines Taranto–Brindisi, owned by the national company FS, and Martina–Lecce, owned by FSE. It is served by regional and, on the Taranto-Brindisi line, by long-distance trains also.

Sport
The local football club is the Virtus Francavilla, that has its home ground in John Paul II Stadium.

People
Ottaviano Andriani (b. 1974), marathon runner
Cosimo Caliandro (1982–2011), middle-distance runner
Clementina Forleo (b. 1963), judge
Giuseppe Renato Imperiali (1651–1737), cardinal
Michele Imperiali Simeana (1736–1782), prince
Giacomo Leone (b. 1971), long-distance runner
Francesco Ribezzo (b. 8 May 1875, died Lecce, 19 October 1952), glottologist - the science of tongues or languages; comparative philology, particularly the dialect of F. Fontana

Twin towns
 San Giovanni al Natisone, Italy

References

External links 

  Official website

 
Cities and towns in Apulia
Localities of Salento
Castles in Italy